Father of the Bride may refer to:

 Father of the bride, a common role in a wedding
Father of the Bride (novel), 1949 novel by Edward Streeter
Father of the Bride (franchise), a media franchise based on the 1949 novel.
Father of the Bride (1950 film), starring Spencer Tracy, Joan Bennett, and Elizabeth Taylor, based on the 1949 novel
Father of the Bride (TV series), a 1961–62 television series
Father of the Bride (1991 film), remake of the 1950 film, starring Steve Martin, Diane Keaton and Martin Short
Father of the Bride Part II (1995), sequel to the 1991 film
Father of the Bride (2022 film), an adaptation of the novel starring Andy García and Gloria Estefan
Father of the Bride (album), an album by Vampire Weekend
"Father of the Bride" (Frasier episode)
"Father of the Bride", the twentieth episode of the eleventh season of CSI: Crime Scene Investigation
"Father of the Bride", a short story by Connie Willis